The UEFA Women's U-19 Championship 2007 Final Tournament was held in Iceland between 18–29 July 2007. Players born after 1 January 1988 were eligible to participate in this competition.

Final tournament

Group stage

Group A

Group B

Knockout stage

Semifinals

Final

Awards

Goalscorers
3 goals
 Ellen White
 Marie-Laure Delie
 Fanndís Friðriksdóttir

2 goals

 Nathalie Bock
 Stephanie Goddard
 Isabel Kerschowski
 Monique Kerschowski
 Nadine Keßler
 Ingvild Isaksen
 Maren Mjelde

1 goal

  Emma Madsen
  Sanne Troelsgaard
  Katrine Veje
  Sophie Bradley
  Danielle Buet
  Natasha Dowie
  Elizabeth Edwards
  Fern Whelan
  Laura Agard
  Charlotte Amaury
  Amandine Henry
  Eugénie Le Sommer
  Chloé Mazaloubeaud
  Nicole Banecki
  Susanne Hartel
  Imke Wübbenhorst
  Ida Elise Enget
  Isabell Herlovsen
  Elise Thorsnes
  Marta Torrejón
  María Paz Vilas

own goal
  Jayne Eadie (playing against Poland)

External links
Official website

2007
Women
2007 in women's association football
2007
2007 in Icelandic football
2007–08 in German women's football
2007–08 in English women's football
2007–08 in French women's football
2007–08 in Spanish women's football
2007–08 in Polish football
2007 in Norwegian women's football
2007–08 in Danish women's football
July 2007 sports events in Europe
2007 in youth association football